Series 35 of University Challenge began on 19 September 2005 and was broadcast on BBC Two. This is a list of the matches played, their scores, and outcomes.

Main draw

 Winning teams are highlighted in bold.
 Teams with green scores (winners) returned in the next round, while those with red scores (losers) were eliminated.
 Teams with orange scores have lost, but survived as highest scoring losers.
 Teams with black scores have been disqualified.

First round

Highest Scoring Losers Playoffs

Second round

Quarterfinals

Semifinals

Final

 The trophy and title were awarded to the Manchester team comprising Chris Holmes, Gareth Aubrey, Joseph Meagher and Adrian Anslow.
 The trophy was presented by Peter Ackroyd.

External links
Blanchflower Results Table from blanchflower.org

2006
2005 British television seasons
2006 British television seasons